= Goon Dip Mountain =

Mountain in Alaska, United States

Coordinates: 57°45′10″N 136°09′00″W

Goon Dip Mountain is a summit in Sitka City and Borough, Alaska, in the United States. With an elevation of 1,601 feet (488 m), Goon Dip Mountain is the 2151st highest summit in the state of Alaska.

Goon Dip Mountain was named in 1939 for Goon Dip, a Chinese American diplomat and mine official who died in 1936.
